Electrophoresis is a peer-reviewed scientific journal covering all aspects of electrophoresis, including new or improved analytical and preparative methods, development of theory, and innovative applications of electrophoretic methods in the study of proteins, nucleic acids, and other compounds.

Abstracting and indexing 
The journal is abstracted and indexed in:

According to the Journal Citation Reports, the journal has a 2020 impact factor of 3.535, ranking it 27th out of 87 journals in the category "Chemistry, Analytical" and 29th out of 78 in the category "Biochemical Research Methods".

References

External links 
 

Electrophoresis
Biochemistry journals
Electrochemistry journals
English-language journals
Publications established in 1980
Wiley (publisher) academic journals